The 2013 AFC Beach Soccer Championship was a continental beach soccer tournament which took place from 22 to 26 January 2013, at a temporary stadium and adjacent pitch on the Katara Beach in Doha, Qatar. The stadium will have a capacity of 3,000 spectators.

The two finalists and the third place play-off winner earned qualification to represent Asia at the 2013 FIFA Beach Soccer World Cup in Papeete, Tahiti.

Participating teams
Sixteen teams have been confirmed to be taking part in the tournament, a record number, surpassing that of the eleven teams that competed in the 2011 qualifiers. The first 13 participating teams are as follows:

 *
 
 
 
 
 
 
 

 
 *
 
 
 
 *
 
 

The organizers left three slots available and would announce who the three teams would be inside of two weeks after the draw. It was learned on 8 January 2013 that the Philippines have fielded a team to participate in the Asian qualifier. It was also learned that Afghanistan and Thailand will also participate. These newly-known entries have been indicated with a *.

Group stage
The draw to divide the teams into the following four groups was conducted on December 20, 2012, in Doha. The subsequent fixtures were determined on 10 January 2013.

All kickoff times are listed as Qatar local time (UTC+3).

Group A

Group B

Group C

Group D

Playoff stage
After the group stage had concluded, a draw was held at 21:30 to determine the match-ups for all 16 teams, including the group winners, based on where the teams place.

13th Place Playoff

Thirteenth place semifinals

Fifteenth place final

Thirteenth place final

9th Place Playoff

Ninth place semifinals

Eleventh place final

Ninth place final

5th Place Playoff

Fifth place semifinals

Seventh place final

Fifth place final

Championship playoff

Semifinals

Third place play off

Final

Champion

Awards

Top scorers

Final standings

References

Beach Soccer Championship
2013
Qualification Afc
International association football competitions hosted by Qatar
2013 in beach soccer
2012–13 in Qatari football